"Back It Up" is a 2015 song by American singer Prince Royce, featuring Jennifer Lopez and Pitbull. The song was released on May 4, 2015 as the second single taken from Royce's fourth studio album, Double Vision.

There are three versions available, a Spanglish version and a Spanish version, with both making chart appearances, and the original 
English version, featuring only Pitbull.

"Back It Up" marks as the eighth of nine collaborations between Lopez and Pitbull, in lined with "Fresh Out the Oven" in 2009, "On the Floor" in 2011, "Dance Again" in 2012, "Live It Up" in 2013, "We Are One (Ole Ola)" in 2014 with  Claudia Leitte, "Booty" in 2014, a song entitled "Drinks for You (Ladies Anthem)" from Pitbull's Global Warming album in 2012 and followed by "Sexy Body" off his album Climate Change released in 2017.

Track listing
Digital download
"Back It Up" (featuring Pitbull) – 3:21

Digital download
"Back It Up" (featuring Jennifer Lopez & Pitbull) – 3:20

Digital download Spanish version
"Back It Up" (featuring Jennifer Lopez & Pitbull) [Spanish Version] – 3:20

Other versions
 Dave Aude Club Mix – 5:56

Music video
The music video was filmed in Miami and directed by Colin Tilley. It was released on June 9, 2015 The Spanglish version (included as the Album version) was used for the music video.

Promotion
Prince Royce performed the song live on American Idol, along with Jennifer Lopez and Pitbull, on 13 May, Good Morning America on 27 July and The View on 28 July.

Chart performance
The Spanish-language version of "Back It Up" debuted on the US Hot Latin Songs chart at number 27 for the week of May 30, 2015. Total sales for the week were 23,000 downloads.

Charts

Weekly charts

Year-end charts

Certifications

External links
Lyrics at LyricsOnDemand.com

References

2015 singles
Prince Royce songs
Jennifer Lopez songs
Pitbull (rapper) songs
RCA Records singles
2015 songs
Songs written by Savan Kotecha
Songs written by Ilya Salmanzadeh
Song recordings produced by Ilya Salmanzadeh
Songs written by Prince Royce
Songs written by Pitbull (rapper)
Music videos directed by Colin Tilley
Song recordings produced by Jason Evigan